Komatha En Kulamatha is a 1973 Indian Tamil-language drama film, directed by M. A. Thirumugam and produced by Sandow M. M. A. Chinnappa Thevar. The film stars Prameela and Srikanth, with a cow in a major role. Thengai Srinivasan, M. Bhanumathi, Nagesh, S. N. Lakshmi, Major Sundarrajan and S. A. Ashokan play supporting roles. It was released on 27 July 1973. The film was remade in Telugu as Palle Paduchu, Kannada as Seethe Alla Savithri and in Hindi as Gaai Aur Gori in (1973).

Plot

Cast 
 Prameela as Vijaya
 Srikanth as Arun
 Nagesh as Ramu
 Thengai Srinivasan as Vasu
 M. Bhanumathi as Mohana
 S. N. Lakshmi as Arun's Mother
 S. A. Ashokan as Sengotan
 Major Sundarrajan as Nattamai
V. Gopalakrishnan as Soma Sundaram
 Baby Sumathi as Valli
 Cow as Lakshmi
 Dog as Tommy

Soundtrack 
Music was composed by Shankar–Ganesh. P. Susheela is the only playback singer in the soundtrack.

References

External links 

1970s Tamil-language films
1973 films
Films about cattle
Films directed by M. A. Thirumugam
Films scored by Shankar–Ganesh
Films set in 1973
Hindu devotional films
Indian drama films
Tamil films remade in other languages